The 2022 Four Continents Figure Skating Championships were held from January 18–23, 2022 in Tallinn, Estonia. Held annually since 1999 (except 2021 due to the COVID-19 pandemic), the competition featured skaters from the Americas, Asia, Africa, and Oceania. Medals were awarded in the disciplines of men's singles, women's singles, pairs, and ice dance. Although the event was designed for non-European skaters, the International Skating Union asked the Estonian Skating Union, the host of the 2022 European Championships, to host the Four Continents Championships in the same venue after no non-European ISU members applied to host following the Chinese Skating Association's withdrawal.

Tianjin, China was announced as the original host in October 2020. This would have been China's second time hosting the Four Continents, following the 2003 edition in Beijing. The 2022 Four Continents Championships were the second ISU Championship-level event and one of several events overall cancelled by the Chinese Skating Association during the COVID-19 pandemic.

Upon China's withdrawal as host on September 13, 2021, the International Skating Union asked for other non-European ISU members to apply as alternative hosts on the originally scheduled dates, with any relocation decision to be determined at the ISU Council meeting on October 1. However, no other qualified members chose to apply, resulting in the event having a European host for the first time.

Impact of the COVID-19 pandemic 
During the 2020–21 season, the CSA had already cancelled several events due to the country's stringent quarantine requirements – 21 days in isolation for non-residents – and limited flights in and out of the country; among the cancelled events were the 2021 World Junior Championships and the Olympic test event, the 2020–21 Grand Prix Final. Less than a month prior to the cancellation of the Four Continents Championships, the CSA cancelled its annual Grand Prix event, the Cup of China, for similar reasons as the events last season. Again citing "the complicated epidemic situation," the CSA, the local organizing committee, and the Tianjin Municipal Government informed the ISU of the cancellation of Four Continents on September 13, 2021.

The Four Continents Championships would have been the first ISU Championship event during the 2021–22 season to be cancelled, before being relocated to Tallinn. The ISU and various host federations had already cancelled or relocated several other events earlier in the season, including events on the Junior Grand Prix, Grand Prix, and Challenger Series. After the ISU was able to find a replacement host for Cup of China, it again asked non-European ISU members to consider applying to host Four Continents on the originally scheduled dates. After the search was unsuccessful for Four Continents, with no federations applying to host, Tallinn was chosen as the replacement host due to it hosting the European Championships a week prior.

Due to the original Four Continents' proximity in both geographical location and timeline to the 2022 Winter Olympics in Beijing, China's decision to cancel the event prompted further concerns about whether the Winter Olympics would be able to proceed as scheduled, and if so, be conducted in a safe manner.

Qualification

Age and minimum TES requirements 
The competition was open to skaters from all non-European member nations of the International Skating Union. The corresponding competition for European skaters was the 2022 European Championships.

Skaters were eligible for the 2022 Four Continents Championships if they turned 15 years of age before July 1, 2021, and met the minimum technical elements score requirements. The ISU accepted scores if they were obtained at senior-level ISU-recognized international competitions during the ongoing season at least 21 days before the first official practice day of the championships or during the two preceding seasons (adjusted from the traditional one due to the pandemic).

Number of entries per discipline 
Each qualifying ISU member nation may have up to three entries per discipline.

Schedule

Entries 
Member nations began announcing their selections in December 2021. The International Skating Union published a complete list of entries on December 29, 2021.

Changes to preliminary assignments

Medal summary

Medalists 
Medals awarded to the skaters who achieve the highest overall placements in each discipline:

Small medals awarded to the skaters who achieve the highest short program or rhythm dance placements in each discipline:

Small medals awarded to the skaters who achieve the highest free skating or free dance placements in each discipline:

Medals by country 
Table of medals for overall placement:

Table of small medals for placement in the short/rhythm segment:

Table of small medals for placement in the free segment:

Results

Men

Women

Pairs

Ice dance

References

External links 
 2022 Four Continents Championships at the International Skating Union
 Results

Four Continents Figure Skating Championships
Four Continents Figure Skating Championships
Four Continents Figure Skating Championships
Four Continents Figure Skating Championships
International figure skating competitions hosted by Estonia
Sports competitions in Tallinn
Four Continents Figure Skating, 2022